Bhanga is an upazila of Faridpur District in the Division of Dhaka, Bangladesh.

Geography
It has 41463 households and total area 216.34 km2.

Demographics
As of the 1991 Bangladesh census, Bhanga has a population of 214702. Males constitute 50.23% of the population, and females 49.77%. This Upazila's eighteen up population is 105762. Bhanga has an average literacy rate of 25.7% (7+ years), and the national average of 32.4% literate.
code of bhanga:
01.postal code:7830
02.zip code: .....
03.Thana code:21352441

Administration
Bhanga Upazila is divided into Bhanga Municipality and 12 union parishads: Algi, Azimnagor, Chandra, Chumurdi, Gharua, Hamirdi, Kalamridha, Kawlibera, Manikdha, Nasirabad, Nurullagonj, and Tujerpur. The union parishads are subdivided into 136 mauzas and 206 villages.

Bhanga Municipality is subdivided into 9 wards and 26 mahallas.

  Upazila Chairman: S M Habibur Rahman Al Habib
 Upazila Nirbahi Officer (UNO):মোঃ আলমগীর হোসেন

Education

According to Banglapedia, Bhanga Pilot High School, founded in 1889, Sadardi High School (1917), and Kalamridha Govinda High School (1927), are notable secondary schools.
 Madhobpur Technical and B,M College
 Kazi Wali Ullah High School
 Kazi Mahbubullah (K.M) College
 Bhanga Mohila College
 Kazi Shamsunnesa Girls School
 Deora High School
 Bharilhat Nesaria Dakhilia Madrasa
 Syed Zanal Abdin High School
 Abdulabad High School
 Brahmondi High School
 Sunflower Ideal Academy
 Sonamoyee High School
 Sharifabad High School & college
 Munsurabad Govt. Primary School
 Maligram high School
 Pulia High School
 East Sadardi High School
 Bhanga pilot High School
 Hoglakandi Govt. Primary School.
 Tuzarpur S.A. High School
 Hamirdi Pilot High School

See also
Upazilas of Bangladesh
Districts of Bangladesh
Divisions of Bangladesh

References

Upazilas of Faridpur District